Laura Peel (born 29 September 1989) is an Australian freestyle skier. She was two time world champion (2015, 2021) and two time World Cup winner, at the women's aerials discipline. She competed at the 2014 Winter Olympics in Sochi, in women's aerials,  at the 2018 Winter Olympics, in women's aerials, where she placed fifth, and at the 2022 Winter Olympics, in Women's aerials, where she placed fifth.

She competed at the FIS Freestyle World Ski Championships 2011 in Utah, and at the FIS Freestyle World Ski Championships 2013 in Voss. At the 2015 World Championships she won her first world title.

World Cup results

Race podiums

References

External links

1989 births
Living people
Freestyle skiers at the 2014 Winter Olympics
Freestyle skiers at the 2018 Winter Olympics
Freestyle skiers at the 2022 Winter Olympics
Australian female freestyle skiers
Olympic freestyle skiers of Australia
Sportspeople from Canberra
ACT Academy of Sport alumni